Amazing Stories is an American anthology series based on the 1985 television series of the same name created by Steven Spielberg. The series is produced for Apple TV+ and its executive producers for the series include Spielberg, Edward Kitsis, Adam Horowitz, Darryl Frank, and Justin Falvey. It premiered on March 6, 2020.

The name Amazing Stories is taken from the first science fiction magazine, which was launched in 1926 and has continued in various formats for decades.

Episodes

Production

Development
On October 23, 2015, it was announced that NBC was developing a reboot of the 1985 anthology television series Amazing Stories created by Steven Spielberg. Bryan Fuller was expected to write the pilot episode and executive produce alongside Justin Falvey and Darryl Frank. Production companies involved with the series were slated to consist of Universal Television. At that time, Spielberg was not expected to be involved with the series.

On October 10, 2017, it was announced that Apple Inc. had given the production a ten-episode series order. It was further announced that Amblin Television would serve as an additional production company for the series.

On February 7, 2018, it was reported that Fuller had stepped down as showrunner of the series over creative differences. It was unclear as to whether Fuller would have a different role in the production going forward but it was clarified that he had not delivered a script to Apple before his departure. Later that day, it was also reported that executive producer Hart Hanson was exiting the series as well. On May 22, 2018, it was announced that Once Upon a Time creators Edward Kitsis and Adam Horowitz had joined the production as executive producers and showrunners. On December 4, 2018, it was reported that Mark Mylod would direct an episode of the series executive produced by Edward Burns.

Casting
On December 4, 2018, it was announced that Edward Burns, Austin Stowell, and Kerry Bishé would guest star together in an episode. On October 11, 2019, it was announced that Robert Forster would appear on the show and would be his final role after his death in the episode "Dynaman and the Volt." On January 19, 2020, it was announced that Dylan O'Brien, Victoria Pedretti, Josh Holloway, and Sasha Alexander would also appear on the show.

Filming
Principal photography for the series began in November 2018 in Georgia, US. Filming took place in various locations around the state that month including Alto, Forsyth, Griffin, Dobbins Air Reserve Base, and Downtown Atlanta. In December 2018, the production was shooting in areas such as Sandy Springs, Smyrna, Kirkwood, and Flowery Branch. In January 2019, the series was working out of locations in Atlanta including the Starlight Drive-In Theatre, Emory University's Briarcliff campus and the Centennial Olympic Park.

Reception
On Rotten Tomatoes, the series has an approval rating of 40% based on 35 reviews, with an average rating of 5.07/10. The website's critical consensus states, "While Amazing Stories''' aspirations are admirable, it feels more like a dated retread than a heartfelt reboot." On Metacritic, it has a weighted average score of 51 out of 100, based on 14 critics, indicating "mixed or average reviews".Amazing Stories'' has been nominated for a Saturn Award for Best Television Presentation (under 10 episodes).

References

External links
 
 

2020 American television series debuts
2020s American drama television series
2020s American science fiction television series
2020s American anthology television series
English-language television shows
American fantasy television series
Apple TV+ original programming
Television series by ABC Studios
Television series by Amblin Entertainment
Television series by Universal Television
Television series reboots
Television shows filmed in Georgia (U.S. state)